Kevin M. Brooks (born 30 March 1959) is an English writer. He is best known for young adult novels. His The Bunker Diary, published by Penguin Books in 2013, won the annual Carnegie Medal as the best new book for children or young adults published in the UK. It was a controversial selection by the British librarians.

Early life, family and education
Brooks was born in Pinhoe on the outskirts of Exeter in southwest England, the second of three brothers.

At age 11, he won a scholarship to Exeter School, where he felt estranged from the other pupils from better-off families and took solace in fiction. He subsequently studied psychology and philosophy at Aston University in Birmingham. His father died when he was 20.

Career
Brooks's debut novel Martyn Pig was published in 2003 by Chicken House, where it was edited by the founder of the company Barry Cunningham, OBE. They won the next Branford Boase Award "for authors and their editors", which annually recognises an outstanding British novel for young people by a first-time novelist.

By a wide margin his work most widely held in WorldCat libraries is the 2009 novel Killing God (titled Dawn in North America). The title character Dawn "contemplates killing God, whom she blames for her father's disappearance".  "When Dawn's dad found God, it was the worst time ever. He thought he'd found the answer to everything. But that wasn't the end of it." 

With A Dance of Ghosts in 2011, Brooks began a series of adult private detective thrillers set in a fictional English city.

Novels

 Martyn Pig (Chicken House, 2002)
 Lucas (2002)
 Kissing the Rain (2004)
 Bloodline (2004)
 I See You (2005), by Brooks and Catherine Forde
 Candy (2005) 
 The Road of the Dead (2006)
 Being (2007)
 Black Rabbit Summer (2008)
 Killing God (2009); US title, Dawn 
 iBoy (2010)
 Naked (2011)
 The Bunker Diary (2013)
 The Devil's Angel (2014)
 Dumb Chocolate Eyes (2015)
 Five Hundred Miles (2016)
 Born Scared (2016)
 Dogchild (2018)
 See Through Me (2019)
 Bad Castro (2020)

Johnny Delgado series
 Johnny Delgado: Private Detective
 Like Father, Like Son (2006)
 Private Detective (2006)
 Johnny Delgado: In Father's Steps (2008)

PI John Crane series
 A Dance of Ghosts (2011)
 Until the Darkness Comes (2012)
 Wrapped in White (2013)

Travis Delaney series
 The Ultimate Truth (2014)
 The Danger Game (2014)
  The Snake Trap  (2015)

References

External links
 Kevin Brooks on Myspace
 
 Kevin Brooks at publisher Chicken House (archived)
 Brooks at Fantasticfiction.co.uk
 
 

English children's writers
Carnegie Medal in Literature winners
Living people
1959 births
Alumni of Aston University
People educated at Exeter School
Writers from Exeter